Stefan Rinck (born 1973) is a German visual artist working in the field of sculpture. He lives and works in Berlin.

Early life and education 
Stefan Rinck comes from an artist family in Zweibrücken. His father was the educator and draughtsman Norbert Rinck (1933-2016), his mother the painter and art teacher Ute Rinck, his sister is the writer Monika Rinck. Before his studies Rinck learned stone sculpting as an apprentice to a stonemason. Subsequently, he studied art history and philosophy at Saarland University in Saarbrücken and sculpture at the Academy of Fine Arts Karlsruhe with Stephan Balkenhol from 1996 until 2000.

Work 
For his figurative stone sculptures Rinck uses traditional tools and techniques of direct carving. He works with sandstone, limestone, marble and diabase. He finds his sources of inspiration in various epochs in particular the French Romanesque period as well as popular culture such as video games and comics. Rinck’s stone figures build a community of characters, animals, monsters and hybrid creatures endowed with symbols and cultural attributes. He uses examples from history, myths, religion and folklore as reference material and places them in a contemporary context. He often deals with the issues of collective unconscious. The art theorist Bazon Brock states, Rinck adopts the figurative forms of expression of culturally collective fantasies remaining his independent language. One of the key elements of his language is the humorous expression whose lightness stands in contrast to the materiality of the stone. The humor has a liberating effect and helps the viewer to experience the unconscious.  The cross-cultural and trans-historical communication qualities allow Rinck's sculptures to achieve universalizing ends, claims curator Daniel S. Palmer. In 2019, Stefan Rinck was featured in the Thames & Hudson publication 100 Sculptors of Tomorrow. The documentary Heart of Stone by Sonja Baeger which pictures the production of Rinck’s three monumental-in-size sculptures was premiered in 2021 in Berlin.

Public sculptures 
Rinck has been realizing public sculptures since 2008. During his participation at the Busan Biennale in 2008 in South Korea, the granite sculpture The Division of Woman and Man was commissioned. In 2018, the work The Mongooses of Beauvais was permanently installed in the city of Paris at 53-57 rue de Grennelle (Beaupassage). Another monumental limestone sculptures were realized at Vent des Fôret (One of those who were too long in the woods, 2010) and La Forêt d’Art Contemporain (Saint Georges et son dragon de compagnie, 2020) in France. In November 2021, the sandstone sculpture Why I bear / Grosser Lastenbär was inaugurated at Zionskirchplatz in Berlin-Mitte.

Exhibitions 

Selected solo exhibitions

2021: In this Garden he Reads the Diary of the World, Sorry We’re Closed, Brussels
2020: I feel Air from other Planets, Nino Mier Gallery, Los Angeles
2019: Carnival, CAC Chapelle du Genéteil, Château-Gontier
2017: Metaphysical Casino, Semiose, Paris
2011: Die Geister die ich rief, Kunstverein Zweibrücken, Zweibrücken
2007: Vicerunt Viderunt Venerunt (with Uwe Henneken), The Breeder, Athens
2006: Galerie Rüdiger Schöttle, Munich

Selected group exhibitions
 
2021: Supernature, Centre d'Art Contemporain, Yverdon-les-Bains
2020: Biennale Gherdëina 7 - a breath? a name? – the ways of worldmaking, Ortisei / St. Ulrich
2020: Restons Unis, Galerie Perrotin, Paris
2019: Foire Internationale d'Art Contemporain Hors le murs, Jardin des Tuileries, Paris
2008: Busan Biennale, Busan
2007: The Present Order Is the disorder of the future, Frans Hals Museum, Haarlem / Hal & Hof

Public Collections 

Fonds régional d’art contemporain Corse, Corte, FR
Centrum Beeldende Kunst Rotterdam, Rotterdam, NL
Musée de la Loterie, Brussels, BE

Bibliography  

Monographs

Bazon Brock, Stefan Rinck, Lubok Verlag, Leipzig / Sorry We're Closed, Brussels, 2016, .
Stones. Gods. Humans. Animals. Photographs by Ute Rinck, text by Monika Rinck, This Side Up, Barcelona/Galeria Alegria, Barcelona/Sorry We’re Closed, Brussels/Semiose, Paris, 2020, .
Jeanne Brun, Jeremy Strick, Daniel S. Palmer, "Stefan Rinck", Pleased to meet you, n°9, Paris, Semiose éditions, 2021, .

Collective Books

Ansgar Reiß, Apokalyptik als Widerstand. Die Sammlung Tom Biber im bayrischen Armeemuseum, Verlag Kettler, 2014, .
Kurt Beers, Richard Cork, 100 Sculptors of Tomorrow, Thames & Hudson, London, 2019, .

References

External links 
 

1973 births
Living people
People from Zweibrücken
21st-century German sculptors